Tom Pentefountas was the Vice-Chairman of Broadcasting of the CRTC (Canadian Radio-television and Telecommunications Commission), having taken up this post on April 4, 2011 and resigning in November 2015 prior to the end of his five-year term.  He served as President of the National Executive Committee of the political party Action démocratique du Québec from September 2007 to December 2008.

Early life
Pentefountas was born and raised in Montréal in the province of Québec. He is of Greek descent and is fluent in English, French, and Greek.

Pentefountas holds a Bachelor of Laws from the University of Ottawa and a Bachelor of Arts (Honours) in Political Science with a minor in Philosophy from Concordia University, where he received the Jean H. Picard Award for Academic Excellence and Leadership and the Thomas H Moore Prize for Academic Excellence. He also earned a certificate in Entertainment Law from Osgoode Hall Law School of York University and a mini MBA from McGill Executive Institute.

He is a member of the Quebec Bar Association.

Career
Pentefountas is a criminal lawyer by trade. From 1996 to 2011, he was with the firm Silver Sandiford and represented clients in Quebec, Ontario, New Brunswick and Nova Scotia. 
 
He hosted for two years a radio show on CKDG-FM Montreal, providing his expertise on human rights, criminal law and the Canadian Charter of Rights and Freedoms. He was also a regular contributor to the “Gang of Four” on CJAD Montreal.

Pentefountas is a member of the Montreal Hellenic Board of Trade since 1998, serving as Vice-President from 2005 to 2007, and of the American Hellenic Educational Progressive Association since 2007.

Pentefountas ran in the Québec provincial by-election on September 20, 2004 in Nelligan for Action démocratique du Québec where he gathered 6.99% of the votes, reaching 4th place.

He was elected President of Action démocratique du Québec in September 2007 and resigned in December 2008 following disastrous results for the party in the provincial election, citing other priorities in life and his wish to return to law practice. During that tenure he ran in the 2008 Quebec general election in Fabre where he gathered 11.93% of the votes, reaching 3rd place.

Pentefountas' appointment as Vice-Chairman of Broadcasting of the CRTC in April 2011 was criticized by the NDP because he lacked broadcasting experience, a requirement for the job, and was a friend of Stephen Harper's spokesman Dimitri Soudas. He resigned his position in November 2015 ahead of the end if his five-year term.

Electoral record

Federal

Provincial

Fabre

|-
 
|Liberal
|Michelle Courchesne
|align="right"|15,349
|align="right"|45.50
|align="right"|

|-

|-
|}

Nelligan

References

External links

CCSA Connect: Pentefountas lauds “spirit” of independent carriers who provide choice, competition in rural Canada.  Greg O’Brien, CARTT September 22, 2014
“Crazy” CRTC Decision Allows Advertising on CBC Radio 2, Espace Musique.  Wade Rowland, 2013
Speeches

Living people
Canadian political party presidents
Canadian Radio-television and Telecommunications Commission
Businesspeople from Montreal
Canadian radio personalities
Lawyers from Montreal
Canadian people of Greek descent
Year of birth missing (living people)